Bad Samaritans or Bad Samaritan or variation, may refer to:

 Bad Samaritans: The Myth of Free Trade and the Secret History of Capitalism, a 2007 book by economist Ha-Joon Chang
Bad Samaritans (TV series), a 2013 comedy web series
 Bad Samaritan (film), a 2016 horror film
 Bad Samaritan, a DC Comics supervillain

See also 

The Good Samaritan (disambiguation)
Samaritan (disambiguation)
Bad (disambiguation)